is a Japanese professional boxer and former kickboxer, who has held the OPBF super bantamweight title since 2022. 

As a professional kickboxer, he held the K-1 Super Bantamweight Championship from 2017 until 2020, and was the 2017 and 2019 K-1 Super Bantamweight Grand Prix winner. At the time of his retirement from the sport of kickboxing, in December 2020, Takei was ranked as the best fighter at 55 kg and the eight best pound for pound fighter in the world.

Kickboxing career

Early career

Career beginnings
Takei made his professional debut against Tasuku at Krush.47 on November 9, 2014. He won the fight by a first-round knockout, stopping Tasuku with strikes to the body at the 2:33 minute mark of the opening round. Takei would then suffer two consecutive defeates, which would prove to be the only two losses of his professional kickboxing career. He first lost a majority decision to Tenma Sano at Krush.49 on January 4, 2015, which was followed by a majority decision loss to Haruma Saikyo at K-1 World GP 2015 -55kg Championship Tournament on April 19, 2015.

Despite only amassing an 1–2 record, Takei was given the chance to challenge the WINDY KICK super flyweight champion Shuto Hagiwara at WINDY Super Fight 2015 on August 16, 2015. He captured the title by a first-round technical knockout, after he had knocked Hagiwara down three times inside of a single round.

Takei faced Yusho Kamemoto at Krush.59 on October 4, 2015. He won the fight by unanimous decision, with two scorecards of 30–28 and one scorecard of 30–27. Takei next faced Katsuhiro at Krush.61 on December 4, 2015. He knocked Katsuhiro out with a left hook to the body after just 51 seconds. Takei extended his winning streak to three consecutive fights with a narrow unanimous decision victory against Taito Gunji at Krush.63 on February 5, 2016.

Krush Super Bantamweight champion
Takei took part in the 2016 Krush Super Bantamweight tournament, held to crown the inaugural Krush Bantamweight champion. Takei was booked to face Ryusei in the tournament semifinals on April 10, 2016. He won the fight by a second-round knockout, flooring his opponent with a left uppercut in the final minute of the second round, which left Ryusei unable to beat the eight count. Takei advanced to the tournament finals, held on June 12, 2016, where he faced the former WPMF and J-NETWORK super bantamweight champion Yuki Ueba. He made quick work of Ueba, stopping him with a right uppercut at the midway point of the opening round.

After capturing his second professional title, Takei was booked to face Yuichiro Ito in a non-title bout at GRACHAN 25 x BFC Vol. 2 on October 10, 2016. He won the fight by unanimous decision, with scores of 30–27, 30–26 and 30–28. Takei made his first and only Krush title defense against Ryusei, whom he head previously beaten by stoppage in the quarterfinals of the bantamweight tournament, at Krush.71 on December 18, 2016. He won the rematch by a third-round technical knockout, after knocking Ryusei down thrice in the last round of the bout.

K-1 Super Bantamweight champion

2017 Super bantamweight World Grand Prix
Takei participated in the 2017 K-1 World GP Super Bantamweight (-55 kg) World Grand Prix, which was held on April 22, 2017. He was scheduled to face Antonio Orden in the quarterfinals of the one-day tournament, while the other three fights pitted Keisuke Ishida against Charles Bongiovanni, Nobuchika Terado against Jamie Whelan and Kenji Kubo against Son Dachen. Takei won the fight by a third-round technical knockout. He first knocked Orden down with a strike to the body, before forcing a referee stoppage with a flurry of punches at the 2:31 minute mark of the final round. Orden was given a verbal warning in the third round, after hitting Takei with an elbow in the clinch.

Takei advanced to the tournament semifinals, where he faced Keisuke Ishida. He first knocked Ishida down with a left straight, before finishing him with repeated right hooks at the midway point of the first round. Takei faced the former RISE bantamweight champion Kenji Kubo in the finals of the Grand Prix. He won the fight by a clear unanimous decision, with all three judges scoring the bout 30–27 in his favor. Aside from the tournament title, Takei also captured the vacant K-1 Super Bantamweight (55 kg) Championship. A month later, on May 22, 2017, he vacated the Krush Bantamweight Championship.

Title reign
Takei faced the "Legend of Heroes" featherweight champion Namito Izawa in a non-title bout at K-1 WORLD GP 2017 -67kg World Tournament on September 18, 2017. He knocked his opponent down with a head kick in the third round, before knocking him down twice more with flurries of punches, which resulted in an automatic technical knockout victory for him. Takei then faced Victor Saravia in another non-title bout at K-1 WORLD GP 2017 Heavyweight World Tournament on November 23, 2017, in his fifth and final fight of the year. He made quick work of Saravia, winning the fight by a 98 second spinning back kick knockout. At the annual "K-1 awards" held on January 14, 2018, Takei was named the 2017 "Fighter of the Year".

Takei made his first K-1 Super Bantamweight Championship defense against Kenji Kubo at K-1 World GP 2018: K'FESTA.1 on March 21, 2018. He previously beat Kubo in the finals of 2017 K-1 super bantamweight tournament to capture the vacant title. Takei won the rematch by a first-round knockout. He first knocked Kubo down with a right hook, before knocking him out with a second right hook soon after.

Takei faced the ISKA, WKN and WBC Muaythai champion Akram Hamidi in a non-title bout at K-1 World GP 2018: inaugural Cruiserweight Championship Tournament on September 24, 2018. He won the fight by a first-round knockout, flooring Hamidi with a left straight. Takei was then booked to face Yodbuadaeng Fairtex in another non-title bout at K-1 World GP 2018: K-1 Lightweight World's Strongest Tournament on December 8, 2018. He won the fight by decision, after an extra fourth round was contested. Takei faced Sandro Martin in yet another non-title bout at K-1 World GP 2019: K’FESTA 2 on March 10, 2019. He won the fight by a first round technical knockout.

2019 Super bantamweight World Grand Prix
Takei participated in the 2019 K-1 Super Bantamweight World Grand Prix on June 30, 2019. He faced Alex Rivas in the tournament quarterfinals, while the other three tournament pairings saw Masashi Kumura face Phetpangan Mor.Ratanabandit, Samvel Babayan face Koki and Shuhei Kumura face Sadegh Hashemi. Takei beat Rivas by a first-round technical knockout, after knocking Rivas down twice inside of a single round, which resulted in a stoppage victory for him under the tournament rules. Advancing to the semifinals, Takei faced Shuhei Kumura. He made quick work of Kumura as well, knocking him down twice by the 1:46 minute mark of the opening round. Takei faced the reigning Krush Super Bantamweight champion Masashi Kumura in the finals of the Grand Prix. He won the fight by a second-round knockout.

Takei fought Suriyanlek Aor.Bor.Tor. Kampee during K-1's 2019 Nagoya event. He won the fight by a unanimous decision. He fought Dansiam Ayothayafightgym during K'Festa 3. Takei won the fight by a unanimous decision.

On December 9, 2020, at the K'Festa 4 press conference Takei announced his departure from kickboxing. At the time of his retirement, he was the #1 flyweight and #8 pound for pound kickboxer in the world according to Combat Press. He had been ranked in the P4P top ten since July 2019. He's was ranked as the #1 strawweight by Combat Press from May 2019 until August 2020 and as a top ten bantamweight from April 2018 until April 2019.

Boxing career

Early career
On December 12, 2020, at the K-1 World GP 2020 Winter's Crucial Bout event Takei relinquished his K-1 title and announced his transition to boxing. He accordingly joined the Ohashi gym where he would be trained by the recently retired Akira Yaegashi.

For his boxing debut, Takei was scheduled to fight Kazunori Takai on March 11, 2021. He won the fight by TKO in the first round, forcing Takai's corner to throw in the towel after the second knockdown. Takei was booked to face the up-and-coming prospect Azusa Takeda on September 9th, 2021, in the Korakuen Hall. He won the fight by knockout in the first round.

Takei faced the undefeated Kazuhiro Imamura in his third professional bout, which took place on the undercard of the Naoya Inoue and Aran Dipaen bantamweight world title fight, on December 14, 2021. He won the fight by a first-round knockout. Takei was next booked to face Shingo Kawamura on April 22, 2022, at the Korakuen Hall in Tokyo, Japan. He won the fight by a second-round technical knockout. Following this fight, Takei was awarded the best newcomer award by the East Japan Boxing Association for the month of April.

OPBF super bantamweight champion

Takei vs. Apolinar
His four fight undefeated streak earned Takei the chance to face the reigning OPBF super bantamweight champion Pete Apolinar, in the latter's first title defense. The bout headlined an Abema and Hikari TV broadcast card, which took place at the Korakuen Hall on August 26, 2022. In front of an audience of 1,420 people, Takei won the fight by a fifth-round knockout. He had a great start to the fight, as he knocked Apolinar down twice in the second round, with a right hook and left hook respectively, and knocked him down once more with a leaping right hook in the fourth round as well. Takei was leading 40–33 on all three of the judges scorecards after the first four rounds were contested. The fight was stopped at the 2:07 minute mark of the fifth round, as the referee waved the bout off after Apolinar was once again staggered, judging the Filipino fighter to have sustained too much damage. This victory earned Takei the "Fighter of the Month" award for the month of August from the East Japan Boxing Association and eFight.

Takei vs. Tarimo
Takei made his first OPBF super bantamweight title defense against Bruno Tarimo on December 23, 2022, at the Ariake Arena in Tokyo, Japan. The bout took place on the undercard of the Naoya Inoue and Paul Butler undisputed bantamweight title fight, which was broadcast by PXB domestically in Japan and by ESPN in the United States. Takei beat Tarimo by doctor stoppage due to a cut in the eleventh round after scoring a knockdown in the first round. He was up 40–35 on all three of the judges' scorecards after the first four round rounds were contested and was up 99–90, 99–90 and 100–89 at the time of the stoppage.

Takei vs. Baldonado
Takei faced the Philippine national bantamweight champion Ronnie Baldonado in a non-title bout on May 7, 2023. The eight-round fight took place at the Yokohama Arena in Yokohama, Japan and was broadcast by Lemino domestically and ESPN+ in the United States.

Titles and accomplishments

Kickboxing

Professional
K-1
 K-1 Super Bantamweight (55 kg) Championship (One time, former)
 One successful title defense
 2017 K-1 World GP Super Bantamweight (-55 kg) World Grand Prix Winner
 2019 K-1 World GP Super Bantamweight (-55 kg) World Grand Prix Winner

Krush
 2016 Krush Bantamweight (55 kg) Championship (Inaugural; former)
 One successful title defense

WINDY Super Fight
 2015  WINDY KICK Super Flyweight Championship

Amateur
Martial Arts Japan Kickboxing Federation
2011 MA Jr. -45kg Champion
WINDY Super Fight
2011 WINDY Super Fight -45kg Champion
2010 WINDY Super Fight -40kg Champion

Awards
K-1 Awards
 2017 K-1 Fighter of the Year
 2018 K-1 Knockout of the Year (vs Akram Hamidi)
eFight.com
Fighter of the Month (April 2017, June 2019 and August 2022)

Professional boxing record

Kickboxing record

|-  style="background:#cfc;"
| 2020-03-22|| Win ||align=left| Dansiam Ayothayafightgym || K-1: K’Festa 3 || Saitama, Japan || Decision (Unanimous)|| 3|| 3:00
|- style="background:#cfc;"
| 2019-12-28|| Win||align=left| Suriyanlek Aor.Bor.Tor.Kampee || K-1 World GP 2019 Japan: ～Women's Flyweight Championship Tournament～ || Nagoya, Japan || Decision (Unanimous) || 3 || 3:00
|-  style="background:#cfc;"
| 2019-06-30|| Win ||align=left| Masashi Kumura || K-1 World GP 2019: Super Bantamweight World Tournament, Final || Saitama, Japan || KO (Right hook + head kick) || 2 || 0:38
|-
! style=background:white colspan=9 |
|-  style="background:#cfc;"
| 2019-06-30|| Win ||align=left| Shuhei Kumura || K-1 World GP 2019: Super Bantamweight World Tournament, Semi Finals || Saitama, Japan || TKO (2 knockdowns rule) || 1 || 1:46
|-  style="background:#cfc;"
| 2019-06-30|| Win ||align=left| Alex Rivas || K-1 World GP 2019: Super Bantamweight World Tournament, Quarter Finals || Saitama, Japan || TKO (2 Knockdowns rule) || 1 || 2:46
|-style="background:#cfc;"
| 2019-03-10|| Win|| align=left|  Sandro Martin||K-1 World GP 2019: K’FESTA 2|| Saitama, Japan ||  TKO (Referee Stoppage) || 1 || 2:53
|-style="background:#cfc;"
| 2018-12-08|| Win|| align=left|  Yodbuadaeng Fairtex || K-1 World GP 2018: K-1 Lightweight World's Strongest Tournament || Osaka, Japan || Ext.R Decision (Unanimous) || 4 || 3:00
|-style="background:#cfc;"
| 2018-09-24 || Win || align=left| Akram Hamidi || K-1 World GP 2018: inaugural Cruiserweight Championship Tournament || Saitama, Japan || KO (Punches) || 1 || 1:41
|-
|-style="background:#cfc;"
| 2018-03-21 || Win || align=left| Kenji Kubo || K-1 World GP 2018: K'FESTA.1 || Saitama, Japan || KO (Right Hook) || 1 || 1:27
|-  
! style=background:white colspan=9 |
|-
|-  style="background:#cfc;"
| 2017-11-23|| Win ||align=left| Victor Saravia || K-1 WORLD GP 2017 Heavyweight World Tournament|| Saitama, Japan || KO (Punches to the Body)  || 1 || 1:38
|-  style="background:#cfc;"
| 2017-09-18|| Win ||align=left| Namito Izawa || K-1 WORLD GP 2017 -67kg World Tournament|| Saitama, Japan || KO (3 Knockdowns)  || 3 || 1:10
|-  bgcolor="#CCFFCC"
| 2017-04-22 || Win || align=left| Kenji Kubo || K-1 WORLD GP 2017 -55kg World Tournament, Final || Tokyo, Japan || Decision (Unanimous) || 3 || 3:00
|-
! style=background:white colspan=9 |
|-  style="background:#cfc;"
| 2017-04-22 || Win || align=left| Keisuke Ishida || K-1 WORLD GP 2017 -55kg World Tournament, Semi Finals || Tokyo, Japan || TKO (Right Hooks) || 1 || 1:30
|-  style="background:#cfc;"
| 2017-04-22 || Win || align=left| Antonio Orden || K-1 WORLD GP 2017 -55kg World Tournament, Quarter Finals || Tokyo, Japan || TKO (Referee Stoppage) || 3 || 2:31
|-  style="background:#cfc;"
| 2016-12-18|| Win ||align=left|  Ryusei || Krush.71|| Tokyo, Japan || TKO (3 Knockdowns)  || 3 || 2:45
|-
! style=background:white colspan=9 |
|-
|-  style="background:#cfc;"
| 2016-10-10|| Win ||align=left| Yuichiro Ito || GRACHAN 25 x BFC Vol. 2|| Tokyo, Japan || Decision (Unanimous) || 3 || 3:00
|-  style="background:#cfc;"
| 2016-06-12|| Win ||align=left|  Yuki Ueba || Krush.66 -53kg Tournament Final|| Tokyo, Japan || KO (Right Uppercut) || 1 || 1:43
|-
! style=background:white colspan=9 |
|-
|-  style="background:#cfc;"
| 2016-04-10|| Win ||align=left|  Ryusei || Krush.65 -53kg Tournament Semi Finals|| Tokyo, Japan || KO (Left uppercut)|| 2 || 2:15
|-  style="background:#cfc;"
| 2016-02-05|| Win ||align=left|  Taito Gunji || Krush.63|| Tokyo, Japan || Decision (Unanimous) || 3 || 3:00
|-  style="background:#cfc;"
| 2015-12-04|| Win ||align=left| Katsuhiro|| Krush.61|| Tokyo, Japan || KO (Punch to the Body) || 1 || 0:51
|-  style="background:#cfc;"
| 2015-10-04|| Win ||align=left| Yusho Kamemoto|| Krush.59|| Tokyo, Japan || Decision (Unanimous) || 3 || 3:00
|-
|-  style="background:#cfc;"
| 2015-08-16|| Win ||align=left| Shuto Hagiwara ||WINDY Super Fight 2015|| Tokyo, Japan || TKO (Three knockdowns) || 1 || 1:52
|-
! style=background:white colspan=9 |
|-  style="background:#Fbb;"
| 2015-04-19|| Loss ||align=left| Haruma Saikyo || K-1 World GP 2015 -55kg Championship Tournament|| Tokyo, Japan || Decision (Majority) || 3 || 3:00
|-  style="background:#Fbb;"
| 2015-01-04|| Loss ||align=left| Tenma Sano || Krush.49|| Tokyo, Japan || Decision (Majority) || 3 || 3:00
|-  style="background:#cfc;"
| 2014-11-09|| Win ||align=left| Tasuku || Krush.47|| Tokyo, Japan || KO (Body punches) || 1 || 2:33
|-
| colspan=9 | Legend:    

|- style="background:#c5d2ea;"
| 2012-02-25|| Draw || align="left" | Tenshin Nasukawa || Bigbang 8 ||Tokyo, Japan|| Decision || 3 ||2:00
|-  style="background:#cfc;"
| 2011-12-04|| Win||align=left| Kaede Honami || 4th Kokusai Junior Kickboxing || Japan || ||  ||
|-  style="background:#cfc;"
| 2011-11-19|| Win||align=left| Hiroto Ishizuka || TRIBELATE vol.35 -Title Match Festival- || Tokyo, Japan || KO|| 1 || 1:18
|-  style="background:#FFBBBB;"
| 2011-07-31|| Loss||align=left| Kaito Fukuda|| Muay Thai WINDY Super Fight vol.8	||Japan || Ext.R Decision (Unanimous) || 3|| 1:00
|-
! style=background:white colspan=9 |
|-  style="background:#FFBBBB;"
| 2011-07-03|| Loss||align=left| Riku Anpo ||Muay Thai WINDY Super Fight in NAGOYA ～Muay Typhoon!～ || Nagoya, Japan || Decision (Unanimous)|| 2 || 1:30
|-  style="background:#FFBBBB;"
| 2011-07-03|| Loss||align=left| Shodai Matsuoka ||Muay Thai WINDY Super Fight in NAGOYA ～Muay Typhoon!～ || Nagoya, Japan || Decision (Unanimous)|| 2 || 1:30
|-  style="background:#FFBBBB;"
| 2011-06-19|| Loss||align=left| Sho Yamaura || Muay Thai WINDY Super Fight vol.7 || Tokyo, Japan || Decision (Unanimous)|| 2 || 3:00
|-  style="background:#cfc;"
| 2011-04-29|| Win||align=left| Yuzuki Sakai || Muay Thai WINDY Super Fight vol.6, Final || Tokyo, Japan || Decision (Unanimous)|| 2 || 1:30
|-
! style=background:white colspan=9 |
|-  style="background:#cfc;"
| 2011-04-29||Win||align=left| Kaito Fukuda || Muay Thai WINDY Super Fight vol.6, Semi Final||Japan || Ext.R Decision ||  ||
|-  style="background:#FFBBBB;"
| 2011-04-24|| Loss||align=left| Sho Yamaura || MA BREAK-12 -It starts- || Tokyo, Japan || Decision (Majority) || 3 || 1:30
|-
! style=background:white colspan=9 |
|-  style="background:#cfc;"
| 2011-04-17|| Win ||align=left| Yugo Tsuboi || JAKF Amateur || Tokyo, Japan || Decision (Unanimous)|| 2 || 1:30
|-  style="background:#fbb;"
| 2010-09-19||Loss ||align=left| Kaito Fukuda || Muay Thai WINDY Super Fight 4 ||Tokyo, Japan || Decision || 2||2:00 
|-
! style=background:white colspan=9 |
|- style="background:#fbb;"
| 2010-07-11|| Loss|| align="left" | Tenshin Nasukawa || M-1 Muay Thai Amateur 35, Semi Final || Tokyo, Japan || Decision ||  ||
|-  style="background:#cfc;"
| 2010-06-13||Win||align=left|  || Muay Thai WINDY Super Fight vol.3 ||Tokyo, Japan || || || 
|-
! style=background:white colspan=9 |
|-  style="background:#cfc;"
| 2010-04-25|| Win||align=left| Yoshihisa Yano ||  || Saitama Prefecture, Japan || ||  ||
|-  style="background:#cfc;"
| 2009-09-27|| Win||align=left| Haruma Saikyo ||  || Saitama Prefecture, Japan || ||  ||
|-  style="background:#FFBBBB;"
| 2009-04-19|| Loss ||align=left| Yuichi Hatada ||  || Saitama Prefecture, Japan || ||  || 
|-
| colspan=9 | Legend:

See also
 List of male kickboxers
 List of K-1 champions

References

Living people
1996 births
21st-century Japanese people
Japanese male kickboxers
Japanese male boxers
Flyweight kickboxers
Bantamweight kickboxers
Super-bantamweight boxers
Sportspeople from Tokyo

External links
 K-1 profile
 Official blog